The 1945 IFA Shield Final was the 53rd final of the IFA Shield, the second oldest football competition in India, and was contested between Kolkata giants East Bengal and Mohun Bagan on 9 August 1945 at the Calcutta Ground in Kolkata.

East Bengal won the final 1–0 to claim their 2nd IFA Shield title. Fred Pugsley scored the only goal of the match in the second half as East Bengal lifted their second IFA Shield title.

Route to the final

Match

Summary
The IFA Shield final began at the Calcutta Ground in Kolkata on 9 August 1945 in front of a packed crowd as Kolkata giants East Bengal and Mohun Bagan faced each other in a Kolkata Derby for the first time ever in a major tournament final. East Bengal reached their fourth consecutive final, having lost the previous one to Eastern Bengal Railway in 1944. Mohun Bagan also made their fourth appearance in the final after having lost the previous two in 1923 and 1940, being champions in 1911, after they defeated Calcutta F.C. 1–0 in the semi-final.

East Bengal however, were dominant from the start as they created multiple scoring opportunities with their forward line consisting of Fred Pugsley, Appa Rao, Sunil Ghosh, Swami Nayar, and T. Kar constantly creating pressure on the Mohun Bagan defense. The Mohun Bagan custodian D. Sen made a few excellent saves to keep them in the match however, it was in the sixteenth minute of the second half when a powerful attempt by Sunil Ghosh got deflected of a defender and fell onto the feet of Pugsley, who scored with a powerful right footed shot to make in 1–0. Mohun Bagan did get a few chances in the dying minutes of the match but East Bengal goalkeeper A. Mukherjee managed to keep a clean sheet as East Bengal lifted their second IFA Shield title.

Details

References

External links
IFA Shield Finals

IFA Shield finals
1945–46 in Indian football
East Bengal Club matches
Mohun Bagan AC matches
Football competitions in Kolkata